Palmeriam is an administrative village (kelurahan in Indonesian) in  Matraman subdistrict, East Jakarta. The border of Palmeriam are : 
 Paseban administrative village, Central Jakarta in the north
 Kebon Manggis administrative village in the west
 Kayu Manis administrative village in the east
 Pisangan Baru administrative village in the south

The postal code of this administrative village is 13140.

Toponym
The name Palmeriam was derived from paal meriam, meaning the place where the cannon were ready to shoot. This name was given by the native people because of a British arsenal in this place. British troops arrived in Batavia from Malacca in August 1811 aiming to seize the Dutch East Indies from the Dutch, who were at the time a vassal state of France. The Dutch army under the leadership of Governor-General Herman Willem Daendels resisted with some success, but was eventually defeated by the British

References

Administrative villages in Jakarta